The People's Republic of China has submitted films for the Academy Award for Best International Feature Film since 1979. The award is handed out annually by the United States Academy of Motion Picture Arts and Sciences to a feature-length motion picture produced outside the United States that contains primarily non-English dialogue. China has submitted more than twenty films for Oscar consideration, two of which were nominated for an Oscar. Both of these films were directed by acclaimed Chinese director Zhang Yimou, whose films have been submitted by China eight times. Zhang was also nominated for an Oscar for a third film, as a representative of British Hong Kong. The only other Mainland Chinese director to be selected multiple times is Chen Kaige, whose films represented Mainland China twice, and Hong Kong once, resulting in one Oscar nomination (for Hong Kong).

China, Hong Kong and Taiwan are recognized as separate entities by AMPAS and each one routinely sends a film to the competition. Although China, Hong Kong and Taiwan used to have very separate film industries, a more Pan-Chinese film industry began to develop in the early 2000s, with directors, actors and crew members routinely working on projects outside their home territory. In recent years, Hong Kong in particular has begun to submit Mandarin-language Mainland co-productions like The Banquet and Painted Skin to represent Hong Kong.

Submissions
Every year, each country is invited by the Academy of Motion Picture Arts and Sciences to submit its best film for the Academy Award for Best Foreign Language Film. The Foreign Language Film Award Committee oversees the process and reviews all the submitted films. Following this, they vote via secret ballot to determine the five nominees for the award. Below is a list of the films that have been submitted by the People's Republic of China for review by the Academy for the award.

See also
List of Academy Award winners and nominees for Best Foreign Language Film
List of Academy Award-winning foreign language films
Cinema of China
List of Hong Kong submissions for the Academy Award for Best International Feature Film
List of Taiwanese submissions for the Academy Award for Best International Feature Film

Notes

References

External links
The Official Academy Awards Database
The Motion Picture Credits Database
IMDb Academy Awards Page

China
Academy Award for Best Foreign Language Film